This page covers all the important events in the sport of tennis in 2002. Primarily, it provides the results of notable tournaments throughout the year on both the ATP and WTA Tours, the Davis Cup, and the Fed Cup.

Serena Williams triumphed in three top tennis contests in 2002: Wimbledon, the US Open, and the French Open. Other champions that year included Lleyton Hewitt at Wimbledon and in the Tennis Masters Cup; Pete Sampras in the US Open; Jennifer Capriati and Thomas Johansson in the Australian Open; Albert Costa in the French Open; and Kim Clijsters in the WTA Tour Championships.  In international team competitions, the Russian men's team beat France to win the Davis Cup, and the Slovak women's team beat Spain in the Fed Cup.

ITF

Grand Slam events

Australian Open

Men's singles:  Thomas Johansson def.  Marat Safin, 3–6, 6–4, 6–4, 7–6(4)
Women's singles:  Jennifer Capriati def.  Martina Hingis, 4–6, 7–6(7), 6–2

French Open

Men's singles:  Albert Costa def.  Juan Carlos Ferrero, 6–1, 6–0, 4–6, 6–3
Women's singles:  Serena Williams def.  Venus Williams, 7–5, 6–3

Wimbledon

Gentlemen's singles:  Lleyton Hewitt def.  David Nalbandian, 6–1, 6–3, 6–2
Ladies' singles:  Serena Williams def.  Venus Williams, 7–6(4), 6–3

US Open
Men's singles:  Pete Sampras def.  Andre Agassi, 6–3, 6–4, 5–7, 6–4
Women's singles:  Serena Williams def.  Venus Williams, 6–4, 6–3

Davis Cup

World Group Draw

First round losers compete in Qualifying Round ties with Zonal Group I Qualifiers.

Final

Fed Cup

Final Four

Final

ATP Tour

Tennis Masters Cup

 Lleyton Hewitt def.  Juan Carlos Ferrero, 7–5, 7–5, 2–6, 2–6, 6–4

WTA Tour

WTA Tour Championships

Singles:  Kim Clijsters def.  Serena Williams, 7–5, 6–3

International Tennis Hall of Fame
Class of 2002:
Pam Shriver, player
Mats Wilander, player

References

 
Tennis by year